Xiphophorus birchmanni, commonly known as the sheephead swordtail, is a live bearing fish in the family Poeciliidae.

It is endemic to the Pánuco River basin in central-eastern Mexico.

The specific name honours the collector of the type, Heinz Birchmann, from Vienna.

References

birchman
Freshwater fish of Mexico
Endemic fish of Mexico
Pánuco River
Natural history of San Luis Potosí
Natural history of Tamaulipas
Natural history of Veracruz
Taxa named by Alfred C. Radda
Fish described in 1987